Spidia smithi is a moth in the family Drepanidae. It was described by Warren in 1902. It is found in the Democratic Republic of Congo and Uganda.

References

Moths described in 1902
Drepaninae